Isaac Copeland, Jr. (born June 13, 1995) is an American professional basketball player who is currently a free agent. He played college basketball for the Nebraska Cornhuskers and the Georgetown Hoyas.

Early life
Copeland was born in Greenville, North Carolina and attended high school at Ravenscroft School in Raleigh, North Carolina and Brewster Academy in Wolfeboro, New Hampshire. He was a five-star recruit and signed to play with Georgetown in 2014.

College career
Copeland initially played two full seasons at Georgetown but suffered a back injury in 2016, requiring surgery, resulting in a medical redshirt season. He subsequently transferred to Nebraska in the mid-season but did not practice with the team during his rehabilitation. He spent his remaining two seasons with Nebraska, but tore his ACL near the end of his senior season, resulting in missing his final games at Nebraska. Teammate Isaiah Roby wore Copeland's uniform during Senior Day to honor the injured Copeland. Copeland was an All-Big Ten honorable mention as a junior after finishing second on the team in scoring (12.9), rebounding (6.1) and blocks (1.0). In his injury-shortened senior season, he averaged 14.0 points and 5.4 rebounds per game.

Professional career

Texas Legends (2019–2020)
Copeland went undrafted in the 2019 NBA Draft but later signed with the Texas Legends as a local tryout. He would subsequently be reunited with Husker teammate Isaiah Roby, who would be sent to the Legends on assignment from the Dallas Mavericks.

On August 5, 2020, Copeland signed with Lavrio of the Greek Basket League. However, due to an injury, he wasn't able to travel overseas and join the Greek club.

Career statistics

College

|-
| style="text-align:left;"| 2014–15
| style="text-align:left;"| Georgetown
| 33 || 11 || 20.0 || .451 || .389 || .809 || 3.8 || .7 || .2 || .6 || 6.8
|-
| style="text-align:left;"| 2015–16
| style="text-align:left;"| Georgetown
| 33 || 33 || 32.0 || .429 || .272 || .789 || 5.4 || 2.0 || .8 || .6 || 11.1
|-
| style="text-align:left;"| 2016–17
| style="text-align:left;"| Georgetown
| 7 || 5 || 19.6 || .275 || .000 || .842 || 3.3 || .9 || .9 || .0 || 5.4
|-
| style="text-align:left;"| 2017–18
| style="text-align:left;"| Nebraska
| 33 || 33|| 30.7 || .472 || .369 || .702 || 6.1 || 1.2 || .8 || 1.0 || 12.9
|-
| style="text-align:left;"| 2018–19
| style="text-align:left;"| Nebraska
| 20 || 20 || 30.7 || .525 || .352 || .692 || 5.4 || 1.1 || 1.1 || 0.9 || 14.0
|- class="sortbottom"
| style="text-align:center;" colspan="2"| Career
| 126 || 102 ||  || .402 || .326 || .749 || 5.1 || 1.2 || .7 || .7 || 10.6

References

External links
Nebraska Cornhuskers bio
Georgetown Hoyas bio
College stats @ ESPN
G League stats

1995 births
Living people
American men's basketball players
Basketball players from North Carolina
Georgetown Hoyas men's basketball players
Nebraska Cornhuskers men's basketball players
Sportspeople from Greenville, North Carolina
Small forwards
Texas Legends players